The 2013 Mexican League season was the 89th season in the history of the Mexican League. It was contested by 16 teams, evenly divided in North and South zones. The season started on 22 March with the match between 2012 season champions Rojos del Águila de Veracruz and Olmecas de Tabasco and ended on 29 August with the last game of the Serie del Rey, where Tigres de Quintana Roo defeated Sultanes de Monterrey to win the championship.

Standings

Postseason

League leaders

Awards

References

Mexican League season
Mexican League season
Mexican League seasons